The Arrand Block is a historic building located in the Nutana neighborhood of Saskatoon, Saskatchewan, Canada.  The building was built by James and Walter T. Arrand, owners of the James and Walter T. Arrand Contractors' Company; Arrand Construction Company intended to use two of the apartments as their homes. Original features of the building include two story apartments, with sky lights on the top floor.  The building was designated a heritage property on April 10, 1989.

References

Buildings and structures in Saskatoon
Buildings and structures completed in 1912
Neoclassical architecture in Canada
1912 establishments in Saskatchewan